Kizhuvalam-Koonthalloor  is a village in Thiruvananthapuram district in the state of Kerala, India.

Demographics
 India census, Kizhuvalam-Koonthalloor had a population of 32728 with 15230 males and 17498 females.

References

 

Villages in Thiruvananthapuram district